Larry Doheny was a tanker ship that sank during World War II,  after an attack by  on October 5, 1942, at 10:00pm. Larry Doheny sank with six of her crew killed off the coast of Cape Sebastian, off the southern coast of Oregon. Larry Doheny was on her way to Portland, Oregon loaded with 66,000 barrels of fuel oil from Long Beach, California. The torpedo attack caused the #2 and #3 storage tanks to explode. The explosion took out the radio, so no distress call was sent. SS Larry Doheny was built by Sun Shipbuilding & Drydock Company. She had nine cargo tanks, her homeport was Los Angeles.

When built in 1921, the first owner of Larry Doheny was the Norwegian America Line and called SS Foldenfjord. In 1928 the ship was sold to Richfield Oil Company.

See also
 Attack on Pearl Harbor
 California during World War II

References 

1921 ships
Tankers of the United States
Tankers of Norway
Maritime incidents in October 1942
Ships built by the Sun Shipbuilding & Drydock Company
Ships sunk by Japanese submarines
World War II shipwrecks in the Pacific Ocean
United States home front during World War II